The London and North Western Railway (LNWR) Prince of Wales Class  was a class of express passenger locomotive. It was in effect, a superheated version of the Experiment Class 4-6-0.

History
They were introduced in 1911 by Charles Bowen-Cooke. A total of 245 were built for the LNWR, of which 135 were built at Crewe between 1911 and 1919, and unusually for the LNWR, 110 were contracted out: 20 were built by the North British Locomotive Company in 1915–1916, and ninety were built by William Beardmore & Co. in 1921–1922.

The LNWR reused names and numbers from withdrawn locomotives, with the result that the numbering system was completely haphazard. All passed into London Midland and Scottish Railway (LMS) ownership on the grouping in 1923. The LMS gave them the power classification 3P. The LMS renumbered them into a more logical series of 5600–5844. A final locomotive was built by Beardmore in February 1924, which was displayed at the British Empire Exhibition that year; the LMS bought it in November 1924, and numbered it 5845. Later most of the class were again renumbered by the addition of 20000 into the 25600–25844 series in 1934–1935 to make room for Jubilee class locomotives. The arrival of Stanier 4-6-0s also displaced them from their work so withdrawals which had started in 1933 meant that by 1939 only 22 remained. Withdrawals were suspended during World War II, but recommenced in 1944, and just six were inherited by British Railways in 1948. In March 1948, the four then remaining (25648 Queen of the Belgians, 25673 Lusitania, 25752 and 25787) were allocated the numbers 58000–3, but were all withdrawn before renumbering could be applied. (The majority of LMS engines had 40000 added to their numbers but doing so would have intruded on the 6xxxx ex-LNER series).

The LNWR also built a suburban pacific tank engine version - the LNWR Prince of Wales Tank Class.

Variations included Belpaire fireboxes from 1924, and outside Walschaerts valve gear was fitted to four engines in 1923–4 and also to no. 5845 from new, to drive the inside cylinders and valves.

None has been preserved.

Accidents and incidents

On 1 January 1946, locomotive No. 25802 was hauling a passenger train that was crashed into by a fish train at  station, Staffordshire due to that train being derailed by defective points. Twenty people were killed and 21 were injured.

Named locomotives

 See Named LNWR "Prince of Wales" Class locomotives

Notes

References

Prince of Wales
4-6-0 locomotives
NBL locomotives
William Beardmore and Company locomotives
Railway locomotives introduced in 1911
Standard gauge steam locomotives of Great Britain
Scrapped locomotives
Passenger locomotives